"Number One" is a song by Italian singer Alexia, released as the third single from her debut album, Fan Club (1997). Co-written by Alexia, it was her third successive top 5 hit on the Italian singles chart. Also in both Finland and Spain, it peaked within the top 5. A set of Spanish versions were released, although these were not specifically for the Spanish market.

Releases and formats
The song was released in Italy on CD and 12" (coded DWA 96.06), with releases in other European countries following. Once again the German edition would be released by ZYX, the Spanish release by Blanco Y Negro, the French release by Panic (a subsidiary of Polygram, the Finnish release by K-Tel and the Brazilian release by Spotlight. A full set of releases were commissioned for Europe by Sony Music, once again on their Dancepool label; a Maxi CD, 2 track CD and 12" release (Sony code 663995). 

Two remix releases followed; the 'Happy Remix and Spanish versions' remix release and a second release entitled 'remix'. All the tracks across these two vinyl releases were later released on one CD. This would be Alexia's second American release, once again through Popular Records in 1997, with "Me and You" being added on the releases. The American promotional 12" contained a new remix of "Me and You", though it was mistakenly labelled the 'Extended Euromix'.

Chart performance
"Number One" went on to become an international hit on the charts in Europe. It reached number two in Finland, and was a top 5 hit also in Italy and Spain, peaking at number three and four. In Italy, it stayed within the singles chart for a total of nine weeks. Additionally, the single was a top 40 hit in Flemish Belgium and France. On the Eurochart Hot 100, it climbed to number 60 in December 1996, as its highest position on that chart.

Critical reception
Larry Flick from Billboard wrote that "import enthusiasts are already big fans of this fast-paced Italo-disco ditty. Alexia is a charming ingénue with the potential for great things, as evidenced in a performance that has more natural flair and earthy grit than is normally found on records like these. Producer Robyx surrounds her with a strobing dance beat and fluttering flamenco guitars, à la No Mercy's "Where Do You Go". One of several festive, hit-worthy jams on Alexia's forthcoming debut album, Fun Club." Pan-European magazine Music & Media described the song as "vocal dreamhouse by Italo producer Robyx. In the Club Short Mix, the usual piano is replaced by an acoustic guitar which gives the song that lucky holiday feeling."

Music video
The accompanying music video for "Number One" was directed by Italian director Alessandra Pescetta. It first aired in January 1997.

Track listing

 7" single, Germany
"Number One" (Radio Mix) — 3:47
"Number One" (Club Short Mix) — 3:42

 12" single, Italy
"Number One" (Euro Mix) — 7:49
"Number One" (Galaxy Mix) — 8:30
"Number One" (Club Mix) — 7:02
"Number One" (Acapella) — 3:42

 CD single, Italy
"Number One" (Radio Mix) — 3:47
"Number One" (Club Short Mix) — 3:42

 CD maxi, Europe
"Number One" (Radio Mix) — 3:47
"Number One" (Club Short Mix) — 3:42
"Number One" (Euro Mix) — 7:49
"Number One" (Club Mix) — 7:02
"Number One" (Galaxy Mix) — 8:30
"Number One" (Acappella) — 3:42

Charts

References

1996 singles
1996 songs
Alexia (Italian singer) songs
English-language Italian songs
Eurodance songs
Songs written by Roberto Zanetti
Songs written by Alexia (Italian singer)